is a life simulation video game developed by h.a.n.d. and Bandai Namco Games for the Nintendo 3DS. The game was released in Japan on August 1, 2013, in North America on April 11, 2014, and in Europe on October 24.

The title has been followed up by the sequel, Disney Magical World 2.

Gameplay 

The game uses either a previously made Mii or newly made in-game character to complete quests in the town of Castleton.
The game features various activities such as fishing, card collecting, gardening, making clothes and decorating the town's cafe, as well as making the food to be sold. When completing these activities, the player is awarded with stickers which act as a leveling up system, allowing the player to progress further in the game.

The game features 4 main plot lines: one in Cinderella's world, one in Wonderland, one in the Hundred Acre Wood and one in Agrabah. These can be done in any order and require the player to help the main characters of each world by battling ghosts in dungeons. The Cinderella world also allows players to attend balls, in which a rhythm-based style of game is played.

As well as this, numerous Disney characters and other non-playable characters will arrive in Castleton giving the player various quests which require the player to enter each of these worlds outside of the plot lines, and foraging for materials. As the player progresses through the story, more weapons and armor become available which must be made using the materials that the player finds in the various dungeons.

Reception 

Disney Magical World has received mostly positive reviews, scoring 71/100 on Metacritic. Nintendo World Report awarded the game 8.5/10, praising the wide range of activities and gameplay but felt that the loading times interrupted the game's progress. Game Revolution gave it a 3 out of 5, saying while packed with characters and collectables, criticized the repetitive tasks and lack of a main attraction.

As of March 31, 2014, the game has shipped 500,000 copies.

Sequel

References

External links 

 Official English website
 Official Japanese website 

2013 video games
Bandai Namco Entertainment franchises
Bandai Namco games
Crossover video games
Disney video games
H.a.n.d. games
Life simulation games
Mickey Mouse video games
Multiplayer and single-player video games
Nintendo 3DS eShop games
Nintendo 3DS games
Nintendo 3DS-only games
Nintendo games
Nintendo Network games
Video games about size change
Video games developed in Japan
Video games featuring protagonists of selectable gender
Video games set in castles